The discography of the electronic dance music duo Orbital consists of ten studio albums, three original score albums, three live/session albums, six compilation albums, two DJ-Mix albums, four extended plays, and eighteen singles.

Albums

Studio albums

Soundtrack albums

Live albums

Compilation albums

Singles and extended plays

Compilations 
The Bedroom Sessions (Various Artists, selected by Orbital, released with the April 2002 issue of Mixmag.) (2002) UK
Back to Mine (DJ Mix album) (2002)

Compilation appearances 
Tracks not released on an Orbital release

Featured songs 
  Sonatine  (1993) "Belfast"
 Shopping (1994) "Crash and Carry"
 Hackers (1995) Soundtrack Vol.1 • "Halcyon + On + On" (shortened version) (Used as the film's theme)
 Hackers (1995) Soundtrack Vol.2 • "Speed Freak [Moby Remix]"
 Mortal Kombat (1995) • "Halcyon + On + On"
 Johnny Mnemonic (1995) • "Sad But True"
 The Saint (1997) • "The Saint Theme"
 A Life Less Ordinary (1997) • "The Box" and "Dŵr Budr"
 Test Drive 4 (1997) • "Out There Somewhere? (Part 2)" (Background music for the main menu)
 Spawn (1997) • "Satan" (with Kirk Hammett)
 π (1998) • "P.E.T.R.O.L"
 Human Traffic (1999) • "Belfast" (Played when the ravers are driving back from the house party and the sun rises over Cardiff, viewed from above)
 The Beach (2000) • "Beached"
 Groove (2000) • "Halcyon + On + On"
 CKY2K (2001) • "Halcyon + On + On"
 FreQuency (2001) • "Funny Break (One Is Enough) (Weekend Ravers Mix)"
 24 Hour Party People (2002) • "Satan" (Played when Shaun Ryder fires a gun and sells the mastertapes of the Happy Mondays album Yes Please! to Tony Wilson in Dry Bar Fac 201)
 XXX (2002) • "Technologicque Park" (original to this film) (Orbital appears in the film performing during the night club/rave sequences)
 ER (episode: "Insurrection") • "Frenetic"
 BBC 40th anniversary celebration of Doctor Who (2003) • Doctor Who?
 Keen Eddie • (original to this programme) (score for first episode) (2003)
 Haggard: The Movie (2003) • "Doctor?" (Played while Valo and Falcone tape fæces to Glauren's garage door)
 Mean Girls (2004) • "Halcyon + On + On" (not on soundtrack) (Played in the last scene of Mean Girls before closing credits)
 It's All Gone Pete Tong • "Frenetic (Short Mix)"
 Wipeout • "Kein Trink Wasser", "P.E.T.R.O.L"
 Forza Motorsport 2 • "Nothing Left"
 Long Way Round (2004 BBC series) • "One Perfect Sunrise"

Selected remixes
To clarify, these are remixes by Paul Hartnoll and Phil Hartnoll, but not those which are described as an "Orbital Mix" involving The Orb or William Orbit.
 Madonna – "Bedtime Story"
 Kraftwerk – "Expo 2000"
 Meat Beat Manifesto – "Edge of No Control" and "Mindstream"
 EMF – "It's You"
 Queen Latifah – "Come Into My House"
 The Shamen – "Hear Me O My People"

References

Electronic music discographies
Discography